Devil Dog: The Hound of Hell is a 1978 American TV movie directed by Curtis Harrington. The story centers on a suburban family and the experiences they endure from a possessed dog that they innocently adopt. The film stars Richard Crenna as Mike Barry, the father; Yvette Mimieux as Betty, the mother; and Kim Richards and Ike Eisenmann as Bonnie and Charlie, their children. The two child actors previously played siblings in the Witch Mountain films from Walt Disney Productions.

Plot
The Barry family acquire a German Shepherd puppy after their old one dies in an accident. They buy the puppy from a seemingly friendly fruit vendor who is actually a Satanist who bred the dog during an evil ceremony, causing it to be possessed. The satanic cult then gives away the dog's offspring in order to wreak havoc in the world in the hope that Satan will overcome good once and for all.

The dog acts very strangely when they bring it home, leading the father, Mike, and the family maid to believe that there is something wrong with it. Mike starts to believe so after the maid is killed in a fire while she was watching the dog and he is nearly forced to stick his arm into a lawnmower while it is running and the dog is present. Mike barely avoids having his arm cut off and soon the dog begins to exhibit mind control powers that allow it to kill, injure or mentally control many victims. Eventually, the family's souls are possessed by the dog causing them to act strangely, including Mike's son framing another student by stealing a watch and planting it in a classmate's locker, thus allowing him to win the student election.

Mike finally decides that the dog has overstayed its welcome when he finds a secret shrine to Satan in the attic. Mike tries to shoot the demonic beast to put an end to the hardships, but it is unharmed. Realizing that the dog is possessed, Mike finally makes a special trip to Ecuador to determine how to destroy the animal. Unfortunately, there is no way to kill it, but if you hold a holy symbol to its eye, you can imprison it in Hell for 1,000 years. He takes it to a showdown at his work plant, but there the dog turns into a demonic version of itself and begins to wreak havoc. When he is cornered by the beast, he holds the sign he made on his hand right up to the beast's eye. This causes the beast to be engulfed in fire and imprisoned, getting his family's souls back.

The final scene shows the family loading the family car for a vacation and Mike's son mentioning that there were 10 puppies that the vendor was selling and wondering where the other nine are, suggesting that there are more Satanic dogs out there somewhere and that it is not over yet.

Cast
 Richard Crenna as Mike Barry
 Yvette Mimieux as Betty Barry
 Kim Richards as Bonnie Barry
 Ike Eisenmann as Charlie Barry (as Ike Eisenman)
 Tina Menard as Maria
 Victor Jory as Shaman
 Lou Frizzell as George
 Ken Kercheval as Miles Amory
 R.G. Armstrong as Dunworth
 Martine Beswick as Red-Haired Lady
 Bob Navarro as Newscaster
 Lois Ursone as Gloria Hadley
 Jerry Fogel as Doctor Norm
 Warren Munson as Superintendent
 James Reynolds as Policeman

Release

Home video
The movie was released on DVD by Media Blasters under its Shriek Show imprint on October 25, 2005. Media Blasters later re-released the movie under the same imprint on February 13, 2007, as part of its three-disc Evil Animals Triple Feature, along with Grizzly and Day of the Animals. On July 26, 2011, the movie was released on Blu-ray.

Reception

Debi Moore from Dread Central rated the film a score of three out of five, calling it "a fun throwback that manages to provide its fair share of creepy, claustrophobic moments for as long as the audience can put aside the overt silliness of the concept." Terror Trap awarded the film three out of four stars, noting the film's implausible story while stating that the film was entertaining and featured decent performances by Crenna and Mimieux.

References

External links
 
 
 

1978 films
1978 television films
1978 horror films
CBS network films
American horror thriller films
American natural horror films
Films about dogs
Films directed by Curtis Harrington
American horror television films
1970s English-language films
1970s American films